The Ministry of Defence is a Swedish government ministry responsible for the national defence policy.

The Ministry of Defence has existed in its present form since 1 July 1920. It has been located at its present premises at Jakobsgatan 9 at Gustaf Adolfs torg, Stockholm, since 1966. The ministry has a staff of 131 (2020): political advisers, officials, assistants, clerical officers, military advisers in military issues, etc. The ministry is headed by the Minister of Defence, currently Pål Jonson (M).

Government agencies
The Ministry of Defence is principal for the following government agencies:

Areas of responsibility
 The military defence
 International operations
 Emergency preparedness

See also
 Defence diplomacy

References

External links 
 

Defence
Sweden
Sweden, Defence